Andrés Alberto Desábato (born 30 March 1990) is an Argentine professional footballer who plays as a goalkeeper for All Boys.

Career
Desábato began his career with Vélez Sarsfield. Desábato completed a loan move to Guaraní Antonio Franco of Torneo Argentino A in August 2012. Despite remaining for the 2012–13 campaign, he appeared in just one fixture - versus Sportivo Belgrano on 20 October 2012. In June 2014, Desábato left Vélez Sarsfield permanently to sign for Primera B Metropolitana side Platense. His debut came on 11 October 2014 against Sportivo Italiano, which was the first of thirty-one games in his opening five seasons. Platense won promotion in 2017–18, though Desábato never made the matchday squad.

At the end of December 2021, Desábato signed a deal with Primera Nacional club All Boys.

Personal life
Leandro Luis Desábato, a fellow professional footballer, is the twin brother of Desábato. They are the cousins of Leandro Desábato, who is also a footballer.

Career statistics
.

References

External links

1990 births
Living people
Footballers from Santa Fe, Argentina
Argentine footballers
Association football goalkeepers
Torneo Argentino A players
Primera B Metropolitana players
Club Atlético Vélez Sarsfield footballers
Guaraní Antonio Franco footballers
Club Atlético Platense footballers
All Boys footballers